Apithecia is a monotypic moth genus in the family Geometridae described by Prout in 1914. Its only species, Apithecia viridata, described by Frederic Moore in 1868, is found in India, Nepal, Bhutan, China and Taiwan.

Subspecies
Subspecies include:
Apithecia viridata viridata
Apithecia viridata wilemani Prout, 1931 (Taiwan)
Apithecia viridata reliquifascia Prout, 1926

References

Geometridae genera
Monotypic moth genera
Moths described in 1868
Larentiinae
Moths of Asia